Pak Myong-sun is a North Korean politician. She is the director of a Workers' Party of Korea (WPK) department (possibly the Light Industry Department) and a member of the WPK Politburo. She is the only female head of a party department and one of only two female Politburo members.

Biography
She made her public appearance along with Kim Jong-un at the September 2010 Party Representative Conference when she was elected to the First Deputy Chair of the WPK Central Auditing Commission. In December 2011 she was a member of the commission which organized the state funeral of Kim Jong-il. In October 2013 she was appointed to WPK Central Committee vice director. On August 13, 2020, at the 16th Politburo meeting of the 7th Central Committee of the WPK she was appointed to an alternate (candidate) member of the Politburo of the Workers' Party of Korea and a director of an unspecified WPK department (possibly the Light Industry Department). Pak is one of only two women on the Politburo, the other being Kim Yo-jong, and the only female head of a party department.

References

Living people
21st-century North Korean women politicians
21st-century North Korean politicians
Year of birth missing (living people)
Place of birth missing (living people)
Alternate members of the 8th Politburo of the Workers' Party of Korea
Members of the 8th Central Committee of the Workers' Party of Korea